The Athletics at the 2016 Summer Paralympics – Women's 200 metres T12 event at the 2016 Paralympic Games took place on 12 September 2016, at the Estádio Olímpico João Havelange.

Heats

Heat 1 
19:28 11 September 2016:

Heat 2 
19:35 11 September 2016:

Final 
10:57 12 September 2016:

Notes

Athletics at the 2016 Summer Paralympics